Manikganj is a district situated in  Dhaka Division, Bangladesh. Manikganj is one of the green and pollution free towns in Bangladesh. The recent urbanization and highway built joining Dhaka and Shingair Upazilla has given it an outstanding roadview and better communication. The river Padma flows beside this district and given life to the flora and fauna. It connects the north-western and south-western region of Bangladesh by Paturia ghat. It is well known for its molasses from Jhitka. Baliati Zamindari palace never failed to amaze the visitors.

See also
 Manikganj District
 Manikganj Sadar Upazila
 List of cities and towns in Bangladesh
 Upazilas of Bangladesh

References

Populated places in Manikganj District
Cities in Bangladesh